The 1982 Pacific Coast Athletic Association men's basketball tournament (now known as the Big West Conference men's basketball tournament) was held March 4–6 at the Anaheim Convention Center in Anaheim, California.

Top-seeded defending champions Fresno State defeated  in the title game, 69–57, to win the Bulldogs' second PCAA/Big West men's basketball tournament. 

Fresno State, in turn, received a bid to the 1982 NCAA tournament, the program's second-ever appearance.

Format
The format remained the same as the 1981 tournament, with seven teams in the field. PCAA member UC Santa Barbara did not participate.

With seven teams participating, the top-seeded team was given a bye into the semifinals while the remaining six teams were entered into the first round and seeded based on regular season conference records.

Bracket

References

Big West Conference men's basketball tournament
Tournament
Pacific Coast Athletic Association men's basketball tournament
Pacific Coast Athletic Association men's basketball tournament